Fort St. Jean Baptiste State Historic Site, or Fort des Natchitoches, in Natchitoches, Louisiana, US, is a replica of an early French fort based upon the original blueprints of 1716 by Sieur Du Tisné and company. The settlement which became the town of Natchitoches was founded in 1714 by French Canadian Louis Antoine Juchereau de St. Denis as the first permanent European settlement in the lands later encompassed by the Louisiana Purchase. In 1722, Juchereau de St. Denis in 1722 became commandant of Fort St. Jean Baptiste des Natchitoches. The fort was devised as a trading and military outpost to counter any Spanish incursions into French territory. Soon it became a center of economic significance, particularly with neighboring Caddo tribes. After 1764, Fort St. Jean was abandoned, with the transfer of Louisiana to Spain. The exact location of the fort has since been lost. In 1979, the fort was reconstructed in the vicinity of where the fort is believed to have been located. Today, the fort is an attraction within the Cane River National Heritage Area. The site is also host to living history re-enactments of what life in the fort was like in the 1750s.

References

External links

 Fort St. Jean Baptiste State Historic Site - Louisiana State Parks page
 Cane River National Heritage Area - information page

St. Jean
Louisiana State Historic Sites
Protected areas of Natchitoches Parish, Louisiana
St. Jean
St. Jean
French-American culture in Louisiana
Buildings and structures in Natchitoches, Louisiana
Museums in Natchitoches Parish, Louisiana
Military and war museums in Louisiana